This is a List of World Championships medalists in sailing in keelboat classes.

11:Metre One Design

12 Metre

2.4 Metre

5.5 metre

6 Metre

Dragon

Etchells

Flying Fifteen

H-boat

J/22

J/24

J/70

J/80

Melges 20

Melges 24

Melges 32

Platu 25

Shark 24

Soling

Sonar

Star

Swan 45

ClubSwan 50

Swan 60 OD

Tempest

Yngling

Open

Female

References

Keelboat